Kevin Hardcastle (born August 8, 1980) is a Canadian fiction writer, whose debut short story collection Debris won the Trillium Book Award in 2016 and the ReLit Award for Short Fiction in 2017. The collection, published by Biblioasis in 2015, was also shortlisted for the Danuta Gleed Literary Award and the Kobo Emerging Writer Prize, and was named a best book of the year by Quill and Quire.

Early life and education
Originally from Midland, Ontario, he studied writing at the University of Toronto and Cardiff University.

Writing career
His short story "To Have to Wait" was a finalist for the 2012 Journey Prize, a prize awarded to the best short story by an emerging Canadian writer. His story "Old Man Marchuk" was included in the Journey Prize Anthology in 2014, and later in Best Canadian Stories 15. His writing has also appeared in publications including Word Riot, subTerrain, The Malahat Review, The Fiddlehead, The New Quarterly, Prism International, Event, Joyland, Shenandoah and The Walrus.

His first novel, In the Cage, was published by Biblioasis in September 2017.

Publications
 Debris (2015, collection of short stories )
 In the Cage (2017, novel)
 "To Have to Wait"  (Short story)
 "Old Man Marchuk" (Short story)

References

21st-century Canadian short story writers
21st-century Canadian novelists
Canadian male novelists
Canadian male short story writers
1980 births
Living people
People from Midland, Ontario
University of Toronto alumni
Alumni of Cardiff University
Writers from Ontario
21st-century Canadian male writers